Klysman Henrique de Sousa Silva, known as just Klysman Henrique, is a Brazilian footballer who plays as a  forward, most recently for Brazilian side Horizonte.

Career

Club
In February 2014, Klysman Henrique signed for FC Sheriff Tiraspol. Klysman Henrique made his debut, and only appearance, for Sheriff Tiraspol on 21 May 2014 against FC Tiraspol. Klysman Henrique left Sheriff Tiraspol by mutual consent in February 2015.

Personal life
Klysman Henrique is the younger brother of fellow footballer Henrique Luvannor.

Career statistics

Club

References

External links 
 http://www.fc-sheriff.com/ru/igroki/enrike-klinsman/

1995 births
Living people
Brazilian footballers
Association football forwards
Moldovan Super Liga players
FC Sheriff Tiraspol players
Horizonte Futebol Clube players